The white-bibbed fruit dove (Ptilinopus rivoli) is a species of bird in the family Columbidae.

Subspecies
Subspecies include:
Ptilinopus rivoli bellus P.L.Sclater, 1874 (New Guinea, Karkar Island, Goodenough Island)
Ptilinopus rivoli miquelii Schlegel, 1871 - Yapen and Meos Num (northern New Guinea)
Ptilinopus rivoli prasinorrhous G.R.Gray, 1858 (West Papuan Islands and Geelvink Bay Islands)
Ptilinopus rivoli rivoli (Prévost, 1843) (Bismarck Archipelago)
Ptilinopus rivoli strophium Gould, 1850 - Egum Atoll (Trobriand Islands) and Louisiade Archipelago

Distribution
This species can bes found in the Maluku Islands, New Guinea and the Bismarck Archipelago.  It is also present in many of the islands bordering New Guinea. Among others it occurs in the Moluccas, the Aru Islands Regency. 

The islands on which the white-bibbed fruit dove is relatively common include Buru, Seram and Karkar.

Habitat
Its natural habitats are subtropical or tropical moist lowland forest and subtropical or tropical moist montane forest. It occurs predominantly on primary mountain forest, but it also inhabits secondary forest in a lower density. 

In New Guinea it is typically found at altitudes between 1,000 and 3,260 meters above sea level. On smaller islands such as Aru Islands Regency, however, it can also be found in the lowlands. It is a species that predominantly prefers the tree canopy.

Description
Ptilinopus rivoli can reach a body length of 23.5 to 26 centimeters.  It is smaller than an African collared dove, but more compact than this one. Their tail is shorter and rounded. In this species the sexes are dimorphic. The males have a striking purple head cap. The females are almost entirely green feathered. The plumage is predominantly dark green. There is a large crescent-shaped white band on the chest. Depending on the subspecies, this band can also have a yellowish tinge. The color of the belly and the underside of the tail also vary depending on the subspecies. There is an elongated, narrow spot of purple color on the belly. The tail feathers are bright yellow. In some subspecies, however, the belly is also pure yellow and the tail feathers are green. The beak is bright yellow.

Biology
Ptilinopus rivoli is a fruit-eating species that picks fruits from the branches, but seldom on the ground. The nest is put together from twigs. The laying comprises two eggs, which is atypical for fruit pigeons native to New Guinea.

References
 This article has been expanded using, inter alia, material based on a translation of an article from the Deutsch Wikipedia, by the same name.

External links

white-bibbed fruit dove
Birds of the Maluku Islands
Birds of New Guinea
Birds of the Bismarck Archipelago
white-bibbed fruit dove
white-bibbed fruit dove
Taxonomy articles created by Polbot